On July 26, 1764, four Delaware (Lenape) Native Americans entered a settlers' log schoolhouse in the Province of Pennsylvania and killed the schoolmaster, Enoch Brown, and ten students. One other student named Archie McCullough was wounded.

Historian Richard Middleton described the massacre as "one of the most notorious incidents" of Pontiac's War.

Attack
On July 26, 1764, four Delaware (Lenape) Native Americans  entered a settlers' log schoolhouse in the Province of Pennsylvania in what is now Franklin County, near the present-day city of Greencastle. Inside were the schoolmaster, Enoch Brown, and a number of young students. Brown pleaded with the warriors to spare the children; nonetheless he was beaten with a club and scalped. The warriors then clubbed and scalped the children. Brown and ten children were killed. One scalped child, Archie McCullough, survived his wounds. 

A child survivor recounted "Two old Indians and a young Indian rushed up to the door soon after the opening of the morning session. The master, surmising their objective, prayed them only to take his life and spare the children, but all were brutally knocked in the head with an Indian maul and scalped."

A day earlier, the warriors had encountered a pregnant woman, identified as Susan King Cunningham, on the road. She was beaten to death, scalped, and the baby was cut out of her body. When the warriors returned to their village on the Muskingum River in the Ohio Country and showed the scalps, an elder Delaware chief rebuked them as cowards for attacking children. John McCullough, a settler who had been held prisoner by the Delaware since 1756, later described the return of the raiding party in his captivity narrative:

Aftermath
Incidents such as these prompted the Pennsylvania General Assembly, with the approval of Governor John Penn, to reintroduce the scalp bounty system previously used during the French and Indian War. Settlers could collect $134 for the scalp of an enemy American Indian male above the age of ten; the bounty for women was set at $50.

Settlers buried Enoch Brown and the schoolchildren in a common grave. In 1843, the grave was excavated to confirm the location of the bodies. In 1885, the area was named Enoch Brown Park and a memorial was erected over the gravesite.

See also 
 List of school shootings in the United States (before 2000)
 List of school shootings in the United States (2000–present)

Bibliography

References

1764 in Pennsylvania
History of Franklin County, Pennsylvania
Lenape
Massacres in the Thirteen Colonies
Massacres by Native Americans
Murdered American children
Pontiac's War
School massacres in the United States
Crimes in Pennsylvania
Mass murder in Pennsylvania
Mass murder in the United States
Massacres in 1764
1764 murders in North America
Deaths by firearm in Pennsylvania
Murdered American students